Greater Buenos Aires (GBA), also known as the Buenos Aires Metropolitan Area (AMBA), refers to the urban agglomeration comprising the Autonomous City of Buenos Aires and the adjacent 24 partidos (districts) in the Province of Buenos Aires. Thus, it does not constitute a single administrative unit. The conurbation spreads south, west and north of Buenos Aires city. To the east, the River Plate serves as a natural boundary.

Urban sprawl, especially between 1945 and 1980, created a vast metropolitan area of nearly 1,500 mi² - or 19 times the area of Buenos Aires proper. The 24 suburban partidos (counties) grew more than six-fold in population between the 1947 and 2022 censuses - or nearly 2.5% annually, compared to 1.4% for the nation as a whole.

While annual growth for the suburban area slowed to 0.8% between 2010 and 2022, the 14 million inhabitants in the entire 30-county area plus the City of Buenos Aires account for a third of the total population of Argentina and generate nearly half (48%) of the country's GDP.

History 

The term Gran Buenos Aires ("Greater Buenos Aires") was first officially used in 1948, when Governor of Buenos Aires Province Domingo Mercante signed a bill delineating as such an area covering 14 municipalities surrounding the City of Buenos Aires. The term is also related to other expressions that are not necessarily well-defined: the "Buenos Aires' conurbation" (Conurbano Bonaerense), the "Greater Buenos Aires Agglomeration" (Aglomerado Gran Buenos Aires), and the "Metropolitan Area of Buenos Aires" (Área Metropolitana Buenos Aires, AMBA).

Definition

The National Institute of Statistics and Censuses (INDEC) has defined Greater Buenos Aires.
There are three main groups within the Buenos Aires conurbation. The first two groups (24 partidos) comprise the traditional conurbation, or the "conurbation proper", while the third group of six partidos is in the process of becoming fully integrated with the rest.

Fourteen fully urbanized partidos

 Avellaneda
 General San Martín
 Hurlingham
 Ituzaingó
 José C. Paz
 Lanús
 Lomas de Zamora
 Malvinas Argentinas
 Morón
 Quilmes
 San Isidro
 San Miguel
 Tres de Febrero
 Vicente López

Ten partidos partially urbanized

Almirante Brown
 Berazategui 
 Esteban Echeverría
 Ezeiza
 Florencio Varela
 La Matanza
 Merlo
 Moreno
 San Fernando
 Tigre

Six partidos not yet conurbated
As urbanization continues and the conurbation grows, six additional partially urbanized partidos (totaling 1,062,991 population of as the 2022 census) are now fully connected with the conurbation:

 Escobar (256,449)
 General Rodríguez (143,211)
 Marcos Paz (67,154)
 Pilar (395,072)
 Presidente Perón (102,128)
 San Vicente (98,977)

List of cities in Greater Buenos Aires

Gallery

References

Further reading
 Buzai, G.D. and Marcos, M. (2012). "The social map of Greater Buenos Aires as empirical evidence of urban models". Journal of Latin American Geography. Volume 11 Number 1, pp. 67–78, DOI 10.1353/lag.2012.0012
 Keeling, D. (1996). Buenos Aires: Global Dreams, Local Crisis. Chichester: John Wiley & Sons.

 
Geography of Buenos Aires Province
Buenos Aires